Sardar Ujjal Singh (27 December 1895 – 15 February 1983) was an Indian politician who served as the Governor of Punjab (India) (1 September 1965 – 26 June 1966), followed by acting Governor of Tamil Nadu (28 June 1966 - 16 June 1967). Prior to this he was a participant in the First Round Table Conference, opened officially by King George V on 12 November 1930.

Family
He was the younger of the two sons of Sujan Singh and Lakshmi Devi, a family that traced their ancestry back to Sikh martyr Bhai Sangat Singh. Born in the city of Rawalpindi in the Sindh Sagar Doab of the Punjab, he studied in the Khalsa Collegiate School, Amritsar, after which he completed his Master’s degree in History from Government College, Lahore. His elder brother was Sir Sobha Singh, the principal contractor during the construction of New Delhi, 1911–1930, and father of writer Khushwant Singh,
 was a witness for prosecution in the 1929 Assembly Bomb Case, in which he identified and testified against Bhagat Singh and Batukeshwar Dutt after they threw bombs at the Delhi assembly in 1929, subsequently, Shaheed Bhagat Singh, Sukhdev and Rajguru were sentenced to death for their role in the assassination of Saunders.

Political life
He was elected to the Punjab Legislative Council in (1926–36) and continued serving till 1956. He served as Parliamentary Secretary(Home) in the Unionist Government in undivided Punjab (1936-1941). He was nominated as a Sikh representative to the 1st and 2nd Round Table Conferences held in London. He also served as secretary of the Khalsa National Party, which was created by Sir Joginder Singh in 1935.

After the partition of India, he shifted to Shimla, where Ujjal Singh was elected to the Legislative Council of East Punjab. He served as Minister of Industries and Civil Supplies, and again as Finance and Industries Minister between 1949 and 1956.

He was a member of the Second Finance Commission established by the Government of India from June 1956 to September 1957. He served as Governor of Punjab from 1 September 1965 to 27 June 1966, and as Governor of Tamil Nadu from 28 June 1966 to 25 May 1971.

Education Institutions
As a member of the Punjabi University Commission (1960), he was instrumental in setting up of Punjabi University, Patiala. He was the founder of Guru Nanak Public School, Chandigarh, where he served as Founder President.

Death
Ujjal Singh died at his New Delhi residence on 15 February 1983.

References

External links
Biography of Sardar Ujjal Singh

1895 births
1983 deaths
Indian Sikhs
People from Rawalpindi
Governors of Punjab, India
Governors of Tamil Nadu